Akhlaq Mohammad Khan (16 June 1936 – 13 February 2012), better known by his takhallus Shahryar, was an Indian academician, and a doyen of Urdu poetry in India. As a Hindi film lyricist, he is best known for his lyrics in Gaman (1978) and  Umrao Jaan (1981) directed by Muzaffar Ali. He retired as the head of the Urdu Department at the Aligarh Muslim University, and thereafter he remained sought after name in mushairas or poetic gatherings, and also co-edited the literary magazine Sher-o-Hikmat.

He was awarded the Sahitya Akademi Award in Urdu for Khwab Ka Dar Band Hai (1987), and in 2008 he won the Jnanpith Award, the highest literary award and only the fourth Urdu poet to win the award. He has been widely acknowledged as the finest exponent of modern Urdu poetry.

Early life and education
Shahryar was born at Aonla, Bareilly to a Muslim Rajput family. His father Abu Mohammad Khan was posted as a Police Officer, though the family hailed from village Chaundhera in Bulandshahr District, Uttar Pradesh. He received his early education at Bulandshahr. In his childhood days, Shahryar wanted to be an athlete but his father wanted him to join the police force. It is then that he ran away from home and was guided by Khaleel-Ur-Rehman Azmi, the eminent Urdu critic and poet. He then studied at Aligarh Muslim University and passed his BA in psychology in 1958. He joined MA in psychology but quit it after a year and got admission to the Urdu department of AMU. In 1961 he passed his MA in Urdu. He also completed his Ph.D. in Aligarh.

Career
Shahryar started his career as a writer at Hamari Zubaan, the weekly magazine of the Anjuman Tarraqqi-e-Urdu in 1961 and worked there until 1966. After that in 1966 he joined Aligarh Muslim University as a lecturer in Urdu. He was appointed professor in 1986 and in 1996, he retired as chairman of the Urdu Department. He co-edited the literary magazine Sher-o-Hikmat (Poetry and Philosophy).

Literary career
His first poetry collection Ism-e-azam was published in 1965, the second collection, Satvan dar (Satva yet in English), appeared in 1969, and the third collection titled Hijr Ke Mausam was released in 1978. His most celebrated work, Khwab Ke dar band hain, arrived in 1987, which also won him the Sahitya Akademi Award in Urdu for that year. In addition, he published five collections of his poetry in Urdu script. In 2008, he became the fourth Urdu writer to win the Jnanpith Award, after Firaq, Ali Sardar Jafri, and Qurratulain Hyder.

Lyricist
Shahryar wrote lyrics for select films, from Aligarh where he was approached by filmmakers. Muzaffar Ali and Shahryar were friends from their student days, and Shahryar had shared some of the ghazals with him. Later when Ali made his directorial debut with Gaman in 1978, he used two of his ghazals Seene Mein Jalan Ankhon Mein Toofan Sa Kyun Hai and Ajeeb Saneha Mujhpar Guzar Gaya Yaaron in the film, and they are still considered classic. All his ghazals from Umrao Jaan, 'Dil Cheez Kya Hai Aap Meri Jaan Lijiye', 'Ye Ka Jagah Hai Doston', 'In Aankhon Ki Masti Ke' etc. are among the finest lyrical works in Bollywood. He also wrote for Yash Chopra's Faasle (1985), thereafter Chopra offered him three more films to write for, but he refused as he didn't want to become a "song shop". Though he wrote for Muzaffar Ali's Anjuman (1986). He also left behind unfinished contributions to Ali's Zooni and Daaman.

Personal life
Shahryar married Najma Mahmood, a teacher in the English department in the Women’s College at Aligarh in 1968. They had three children, Humayun Shahryar, Saima Shahryar, and Faridoon Shahryar. 

He died on 13 February 2012 in Aligarh, Uttar Pradesh, after a prolonged illness due to lung cancer.

Awards
 Sahitya Akademi Award in Urdu for his poetry collection, Khwab Ka Dar Band Hai (1987).
 The fourth Urdu writer to win the Jnanpith Award – 2008.
 Firaaq Samman
 Bahadur Shah Zafar Award.

Four theses have been written on Shahryar's works.

Selected bibliography
 Ism-e-azam, 1965.
 Satvan dar, 1969.
 Hijr Ke Mausam, 1978.
 Khwab Ke dar band Hain, 1987.
 Neend ki Kirchen – (English: Shards of Shattered Sleep).
 Through the Closed Doorway: A Collection of Nazms by Shahryar, tr. Rakhshanda Jalil. 2004, Rupa & Co., .
 Shahryar, Akhlaq Mohmmad Khan: Influence of the western criticism on the Urdu criticism, Aligarh.
 Dhund ki Roshni (English: The Light of Dusk): Selected Poems of Shahryar, 2003, Sahitya Akademi, .

Further reading
Urdu language and literature: Critical Perspectives, New Delhi, 1991.

References

Cited sources

External links
 
 The poet who gave Umrao Jaan her voice

1936 births
2012 deaths
Recipients of the Sahitya Akademi Award in Urdu
Recipients of the Gangadhar National Award
Urdu-language poets from India
People from Bareilly district
Indian lyricists
Academic staff of Aligarh Muslim University
Recipients of the Jnanpith Award
Deaths from lung cancer
Indian magazine editors
Poets from Uttar Pradesh
20th-century Indian poets
Indian male poets
20th-century Indian male writers
20th-century pseudonymous writers
Aligarh Muslim University alumni
Urdu-language writers from India